{{Taxobox
| name =  
| image = 2.Epophthalmia frontalis.jpg
| image_caption = male
| status = LC | status_system = IUCN3.1
| status_ref = 
| regnum = Animalia
| phylum = Arthropoda
| classis = Insecta
| ordo = Odonata
| familia = Macromiidae
| genus = Epophthalmia
| species = E. frontalis
| binomial = Epophthalmia frontalis
| binomial_authority =  Selys, 1871
| synonyms = * {{small|Macromia binocellata Fraser, 1924}}
 
}}Epophthalmia frontalis is a species of dragonfly in the family Macromiidae. It is found in India, Nepal, Thailand, and other southeast Asian countries.

Description
It is a large dragonfly with bluish-green eyes. Its thorax is dark reddish-brown with a dark green metallic reflex, marked with yellow. There is a narrow antehumeral stripe, and an oblique narrow stripe on each side; the two stripes meeting over the dorsum between the wings. Abdomen is black, changing to dark reddish-brown at the terminal segments, ringed with bright ochreous yellow. The base of segment 1 is yellow. Segment 2 has a narrow ring as in Epophthalmia vittata''. Segment 3 has a complete broad ring occupying the apical two-thirds of the segment. Segments 4 to 7 have a broad basal ring. Segment 8 has a broad basal triangle of yellow. Segment 10 has a basal vestige of yellow. Segment 10 is entirely yellow. Anal appendages are 
reddish-brown.

See also
 List of odonates of India
 List of odonata of Kerala

References

Macromiidae